John Sproule Walter (6 November 1908 – 17 July 1971) was a Canadian middle-distance runner. He competed in the men's 800 metres at the 1928 Summer Olympics. Walter finished fourth in the 1930 British Empire Games 1 mile. He was later an attorney in Sheboygan, Wisconsin, and died there in 1971 after a long illness.

References

External links
 

1908 births
1971 deaths
Athletes (track and field) at the 1930 British Empire Games
Commonwealth Games competitors for Canada
Athletes (track and field) at the 1928 Summer Olympics
Canadian male middle-distance runners
Olympic track and field athletes of Canada
People from Perth County, Ontario
Sportspeople from Ontario